Isiah Kiplangat Koech (born 19 December 1993) is a Kenyan long-distance runner who specialises in the 5000 metres.

At the 2009 World Youth Championships in Athletics in Brixen, Italy, Koech won a gold medal over 3000 metres, setting a new world youth leading time with 7:51.51.

He also took part in the 2010 IAAF World Cross Country Championships in Bydgoszcz, Poland, finishing fourth in the junior men's race.

On 11 February 2011, Koech became just the fourth man to run the 5000 m indoor under 13 minutes when he clinched victory in 12 min 53.29 sec at the PSD Bank Meeting in Düsseldorf. He then ran a world junior indoor best for the 3000 m at the Indoor Flanders Meeting a few days later, running a time of 7:37.50 minutes  Koech controlled the junior race at the Kenyan Cross Country Championships and took first place, earning a spot for the Junior World Cross.

Despite being a provisional favourite for the junior race at the 2011 IAAF World Cross Country Championships, he ended the race in tenth place, although he did help Kenya to the team title alongside Geoffrey Kipsang and Patrick Mutunga Mwikya. Moving into the senior ranks, he ran over 5000 m at the 2011 World Championships in Athletics and closely finished behind the medallists to place fourth overall. In December, he returned to cross country and won the Lotto Cross Cup Brussels by a margin of over half a minute.

At the 2012 Kenyan Olympic trials he ran the fastest ever 5000 m time in Kenya to win the race and guarantee his first Olympic selection.

Personal bests

References

External links
 

1993 births
Living people
People from Kericho County
Kenyan male long-distance runners
Athletes (track and field) at the 2012 Summer Olympics
Athletes (track and field) at the 2016 Summer Olympics
Olympic athletes of Kenya
Athletes (track and field) at the 2014 Commonwealth Games
World Athletics Championships athletes for Kenya
World Athletics Championships medalists
Commonwealth Games medallists in athletics
Commonwealth Games silver medallists for Kenya
Kenyan male cross country runners
Diamond League winners
IAAF Continental Cup winners
Medallists at the 2014 Commonwealth Games